David Whitehead may refer to:
 David Whitehead (businessman) (1790–1865), American businessman
 David Whitehead (climate scientist), Fellow of the Royal Society Te Apārangi
 David Whitehead (priest) (c. 1492–1571), English evangelical priest
 David Whitehead (soldier) (1896–1992), Australian Army officer